Zapryan Zapryanov (born 15 June 1994) is a Bulgarian footballer who currently plays for Gigant Saedinenie as a midfielder.

Career
He made his league debut for Lokomotiv Plovdiv on 9 December 2012 in a 1–0 home win against Pirin Gotse Delchev, coming on as a substitute.

In June 2018, Zapryanov joined Maritsa Plovdiv.

References

External links
 
 Profile at Lportala.net

1994 births
Living people
Footballers from Plovdiv
Bulgarian footballers
Bulgaria youth international footballers
PFC Lokomotiv Plovdiv players
FC Maritsa Plovdiv players
First Professional Football League (Bulgaria) players
Second Professional Football League (Bulgaria) players
Association football midfielders